Mechanicsville is an unincorporated community in Center Township, Vanderburgh County, in the U.S. state of Indiana.

It is located within the city limits of Evansville.

History
A post office was established at Mechanicsville in 1829, and remained in operation until it was discontinued in 1879.

Geography

References

Unincorporated communities in Vanderburgh County, Indiana
Unincorporated communities in Indiana